Sakshaug Church is a parish church of the Church of Norway in Inderøy municipality in Trøndelag county, Norway. It is located in the village of Sakshaug, just west of the municipal centre of Straumen. It is the main church for the Inderøy parish which is part of the Stiklestad prosti (deanery) in the Diocese of Nidaros. The large, stone church was built in a Neo-gothic long church style in 1871 using plans drawn up by the architect Håkon Mosling (1840-1914).
 The church seats about 850 people.

History
An increase in the population in the parish and the requirements of the Church Act of 1851 led to the building of the new church. The Church Act required that church buildings have room to hold 30% of the people living in the parish. This meant that the church was too small. The new church was constructed in 1871 and it was consecrated on 7 September 1871. The old church was closed and sold to the Society for the Preservation of Ancient Norwegian Monuments. The new church was designed to hold about 1200 people, but more recently the fire regulations hold 850 as the maximum capacity.

Media gallery

See also
List of churches in Nidaros

References

Inderøy
Churches in Trøndelag
Long churches in Norway
Stone churches in Norway
19th-century Church of Norway church buildings
Churches completed in 1871
1871 establishments in Norway